Kristine Stavås Skistad  (born 8 February 1999) is a Norwegian cross-country skier, junior world champion and participant in the FIS Cross-Country World Cup.

Career
Skistad represents the club Konnerud IL. She won the gold medal in classic sprint at the 2019 Nordic Junior World Ski Championships, and the silver medal in the freestyle sprint at the 2018 Nordic Junior World Ski Championships. As of February 2019, her best World Cup result is a fifth place in the sprint final at the 2018 Nordic Opening in Lillehammer. She was selected to represent Norway in the sprint event at the World Championships 2019 in Seefeld.

In January 2023 she became Norwegian champion in sprint, and took her first individual World Cup victory by winning the sprint competition in Les Rousses.

Cross-country skiing results
All results are sourced from the International Ski Federation (FIS).

World Championships

World Cup

Season standings

Individual podiums
3 victories – (3 )
3 podiums – (3 )

References

External links

1999 births
Living people
Sportspeople from Drammen
Norwegian female cross-country skiers